Sand Creek is a tributary of Lytle Creek in San Bernardino County, California.

References

Rivers of San Bernardino County, California
Rivers of Southern California